The 1991–92 USISL indoor was an American soccer season run by the United States Interregional Soccer League during the winter of 1991 to 1992.

Regular season

Southeast Conference

Southwest Conference

Tex-Oma Conference

Playoffs
The 1991–92 USISL indoor playoffs were among the most peculiar in American sports history.  Eight teams entered the playoff from the three conferences.  However, the selection of those eight teams followed no apparent pattern.  Although it appears the league selected the top two teams from each conference, the selection of the remaining two teams is inexplicable.  First, the North Texas Mid-City Flyers, third ranked teams in the Tex-Oma Conference with 32 points entered the playoffs over the Lubbock Tornado (36 points) of the Southwest Conference.  Then the third ranked team in the Southeast Conference, the Atlanta Lightning with 16 points, entered the playoffs over five other teams with better records.  The playoffs began with several inter-conference games, again following no discernible pattern.  The Dallas Kickers, top team in the Tex-Oma Conference, defeated the North Texas Mid-City Flyers in a two-game series.  Then the Tucson Amigos defeated fellow Southwest Conference team Colorado Comets in a four-game series.  Then, the Memphis Survivors, second ranked team in the Southeast Conference, lost to the Atlanta Lightning, the third ranked team in that conference in a single game.  To finish the playoffs, the Atlanta Magic then defeated the Atlanta Lightning, also in a single game.  Finally, the Oklahoma City Warriors, second ranked team in the Southwest Conference, did not play at all.  In the second round, the four remaining team played a round robin with the two teams with the best record advancing to the final.

First round
 Dallas Kickers 7-3, 13-6 North Texas Mid-City Flyers
 Tucson Amigos 9-5, 4-3, 3-9, 7-6 (OT) Colorado Comets
 Atlanta Lightning 8-4 Memphis Survivor
 Atlanta Magic 11-3 Atlanta Lightning

Sizzlin' Four

Final

Points leaders

Honors
 Most Valuable Player:  Chris Cook
 Top Goal Scorer:  Chris Melton
 Coach of the Year:  Carlos Acosta
 Rookie of the Year:  Noel Clackum and Emillo Romero

External links
The Year in American Soccer - 1992

USISL indoor seasons
United
United